The International Hygiene Exhibition was a world's fair focusing on medicine and public health, held in Dresden, Germany, in 1911.

The leading figure organizing the exhibition was German philanthropist and businessman , who had grown wealthy from his Odol mouthwash brand, and was enthusiastic to educate the public about advances in public health. Lingner had previously organized a public-health exhibition as part of the 1903 Dresden municipal expo, and its success led him to plan a larger endeavor.

The exhibition opened on May 6, 1911, with 30 countries participating, 100 buildings built for the event, and 5 million visitors over its duration. It emphasized accessible visual representations of the body, and a particular sensation were the transparent organs preserved and displayed according to a method devised by Werner Spalteholz.

Following the exhibition, its contents became the permanent German Hygiene Museum in Dresden. Its success spawned several follow-up expos, most notably the 1926 GeSoLei exhibition in Düsseldorf.

Other International Exhibitions of Hygiene were held in:
 1910: Buenos Aires, Argentina: Exposición Internacional del Centenario (1910)
 1913: Lima, Peru
 1914: Genoa, Italy

Further reading

 Thomas Steller: Volksbildungsinstitut und Museumskonzern. Das Deutsche Hygiene-Museum 1912-1930, Bielefeld 2014, online: http://pub.uni-bielefeld.de/publication/2724840.
 Sybilla Nikolow und Thomas Steller: Das lange Echo der Internationalen Hygiene-Ausstellung in: Dresdener Hefte 12 (2011).

References

World's fairs in Germany
1911 in Germany
Public health
Culture in Dresden
20th century in Saxony
Hygiene